Blanco Encalada was a central battery ship built by Earle's Shipbuilding Co. in England for the Chilean Navy in 1875. She was nicknamed El Blanco. She participated actively in the War of the Pacific, her most important action being the capture of the Peruvian monitor  during the Battle of Angamos.

Blanco Encalada formed part of the congressional forces that brought down President José Manuel Balmaceda in the Chilean Civil War of 1891. She was sunk during that conflict on 23 April 1891, becoming the first ironclad warship to be sunk by a self-propelled torpedo.

Background

In 1871 the president of Chile, Federico Errázuriz Zañartu, sent the Congress a bill to authorize the executive to acquire two armored warships.  The bill, which was approved only by a vote of no confidence, stipulated that both vessels would be mid-sized frigates and would not cost more than 2 million pesos.

Construction and commissioning
Alberto Blest Gana, the ambassador to the United Kingdom, was put in charge of the project. Blest Gana contracted the ship designer Edward James Reed, an ex-naval architect of the British Admiralty, as the technical advisor. Blest Gana contracted Earle's Shipbuilding Co. in Hull, Yorkshire to carry out the construction.

The two ships were named Cochrane and Valparaíso but later, upon arrival at port on 24 January 1876, Valparaíso was renamed Blanco Encalada by the decree of the Minister of War and Navy on 15 September 1876. This was in honor of the admiral and first president of the Republic of Chile, Manuel Blanco Encalada. The construction of Blanco Encalada started in April 1872 and the ship was launched in 1875.

In January 1878, the president Aníbal Pinto ordered the ambassador to Europe, Alberto Blest Gana, to put the ships up for sale as soon as the dispute with Argentina was resolved to help alleviate the economic crises that prevailed in Chile. On behalf of Blest Gana, Reed offered the United Kingdom Cochrane for 220,000 pounds sterling, but the British were not interested. He then attempted to sell the ships to Russia with the same result.

Operational service

Being the flagship of the Chilean armada, Blanco Encalada actively participated in the War of the Pacific. The frigate's first actions, under the command of Admiral Juan Williams Rebolledo, consisted of taking part in the blockade of Iquique and in the failed expedition to the port of Callao.

Afterward, Blanco Encalada tried, unsuccessfully, to hunt the Peruvian monitor Huáscar.  Williams’ inability to put an end to what became known as the "Huáscar Raids" finally motivated him to resign his command. The failure of a decisive victory against the monitor is primarily owed to the bad state of the engines and boilers of Blanco Encalada and the skill of the commander of the Peruvian ship.

The command of Blanco Encalada fell to the new commander-in-chief of the navy, Comador Galvarino Riveros Cárdenas, who ordered the Chilean armada to regroup and repair the ships. For this purpose, Blanco Encalada was anchored in Mejillones to make repairs to the engine using the workshops of the Salitres de Antofagasta Company.  The hull was cleaned using divers brought from Valparaíso. The success of the repairs, which were finished at the end of September, was limited however.  The ship could achieve, in a test voyage, a speed of only .  After the repairs, Blanco Enclada participated in the Battle of Angamos where the Chilean fleet finally captured Huáscar on 8 October 1879. The last action in which Blanco Encalada participated was the capture, in the close quarters of Mollendo, of the gunboat  on 18 November.

Sinking

Blanco Encalada was sunk by a torpedo gunboat in the Battle of Caldera Bay, Chile, on 23 April 1891 during the 1891 Chilean Civil War.

Commanders of Blanco Encalada

Notes

References
Much of this article was translated from Blanco Encalada (fragata blindada).

1875 ships
Ships built on the Humber
Almirante Cochrane-class ironclads
Ships of the War of the Pacific
Maritime incidents in 1891
Shipwrecks in the Pacific Ocean